Nicolaas Gerardus Maria "Klaas" van den Broek (born July 7, 1955) is a former professional Dutch ice hockey player, who was born in Tilburg, North Brabant.

Van den Broek played for the Tilburg Trappers during the 1970s.  He played all five matches for the Netherlands at the 1980 Winter Olympics.

External links

Dutch Olympic Committee

1955 births
Dutch ice hockey centres
Ice hockey players at the 1980 Winter Olympics
Living people
Olympic ice hockey players of the Netherlands
Sportspeople from Tilburg
TYSC Trappers players